Paratraea is a genus of moths of the family Crambidae.

Species
Paratraea obliquivialis (Hampson, 1918)
Paratraea plumbipicta Hampson, 1919

References

Natural History Museum Lepidoptera genus database

Crambinae
Crambidae genera
Taxa named by George Hampson